Liarea aupouria is a species of land snail, a terrestrial gastropod mollusc in the subfamily Liareinae.  This is the largest species in the genus.

References

Pupinidae
Gastropods of New Zealand